Daniel Liam Sweeney (born 25 April 1994) is an English professional footballer who plays as a centre-back for the  club Stevenage.

Club career

AFC Wimbledon 
In July 2012, Sweeney was one of five academy prospects to be invited to train with the AFC Wimbledon first team and play for the development squad after the club pulled out of the Suburban League.

It is often claimed that Sweeney made a single appearance for the first team in February 2013, although this has proved untrue with Peter Sweeney instead featuring against Wycombe Wanderers.

Kingstonian 
In March 2013, Sweeney joined tenants Kingstonian following his release from AFC Wimbledon. On 4 March, he made his debut in a 2–1 London Senior Cup victory over Hanwell Town. On 6 April, he scored his first goal for the club in a 3–2 Isthmian Premier Division defeat to Whitehawk.

In October 2013, Sweeney was offered a trial with the Championship side Ipswich Town and spent a week training with the club. He made a single appearance for the Reserve team.

On 15 June 2014, Sweeney signed a one-year contract to remain at Kingsmeadow. Despite being offered a contract ahead of the 2015–16 season, Sweeney rejected the offer and played for the K's on non-contract terms.

On 6 October 2015, he made his final appearance from the bench in the Alan Turvey Trophy in a 2–2 draw with Hendon. Taking the K's second penalty, Sweeney hit the crossbar but saw his side win 3–1 on penalties.

Dulwich Hamlet 
On 9 October 2015, Sweeney joined Isthmian Premier Division side Dulwich Hamlet following a seven-day approach. On 10 October, he assisted and scored on his debut in a 4–1 victory at Farnborough. He also scored in the subsequent five fixtures, claiming the Man of the Match award on two occasions.

On 21 November, Sweeney recorded his second assist for the club in a 3–2 win at Bognor Regis Town. After his early goalscoring form, Sweeney attracted the attention of a number of Football League clubs. His final appearance came in a 1–0 defeat to Needham Market on 5 December.

Maidstone United 
On 12 December 2015, Sweeney completed a move to National League South side Maidstone United. On 19 December, he made his debut in a 1–0 defeat at Hayes & Yeading United. He scored his first goal for the club four games later, opening the scoring inside three minutes in a 2–0 win against Bath City.

On 27 February 2016, he received the first dismissal of his career with a second yellow card during a 2–1 defeat at Havant & Waterlooville.

After finishing third in the league with 77 points, Maidstone earned a place in the play-offs. Sweeney featured in both legs of the semifinal 3–0 aggregate victory over Truro City, and came off the bench in the 87th minute of the play-off final at Ebbsfleet United. With the game tied at 2–2 after 120 minutes, Sweeney converted his team's fifth and final penalty to seal promotion to the National League.

On 8 April, the club announced Sweeney had agreed to sign a new deal ahead of the 2016–17 season.

Making 15 consecutive league appearances at the start of the season, Sweeney scored his first National League goal in a 4–2 victory over Solihull Moors on 1 October. On 17 December, he made his final appearance for the club in a 2–1 defeat to North Ferriby United.

Barnet 
On 22 December 2016, it was announced Sweeney would join League Two club Barnet for an undisclosed fee. Joining up with the squad for training immediately, he officially joined on 1 January. He made his English Football League debut the following day as a substitute against Plymouth Argyle. Sweeney played only four times for the Bees between January and October and was loaned out to Hampton & Richmond Borough on 13 October 2017. Following his return from loan, Sweeney worked his way back into the team, and began playing in a centre-back role following the appointment of Graham Westley in January 2018. After Martin Allen took over two months later, Sweeney was made captain. He won the player of the season award for 2017–18, a feat he repeated the following season. Sweeney left Barnet following the expiration of his contract in June 2020.

Forest Green Rovers 
Sweeney signed for League Two club Forest Green Rovers on 1 July 2020 on a two-year deal.

Stevenage
On 18 June 2022, Sweeney agreed to join Stevenage on a free transfer following a title-winning campaign with Forest Green Rovers.

International career 
In June 2016, Sweeney was called up to the England C squad after initially being placed on a contingency list. On 5 June, he made his only appearance for the national team in a 4–3 International Challenge Trophy defeat to Slovakia U21s. Sweeney came off the bench in the 70th minute to replace Elliott Whitehouse.

Personal life 
Sweeney's brother Ryan (born 1997) was also in the academy at AFC Wimbledon.

Career statistics

Honours
Forest Green Rovers
League Two: 2021–22

References

External links 

1994 births
Living people
English footballers
Footballers from Kingston upon Thames
English people of Irish descent
Association football midfielders
Association football central defenders
AFC Wimbledon players
Kingstonian F.C. players
Dulwich Hamlet F.C. players
Maidstone United F.C. players
Barnet F.C. players
Hampton & Richmond Borough F.C. players
Forest Green Rovers F.C. players
Stevenage F.C. players
Isthmian League players
National League (English football) players
English Football League players
England semi-pro international footballers